Whalebone Vineyard is a California wine estate producing primarily Cabernet and other red and white wines in Paso Robles, California. The vineyard is located in the Adelaida District AVA of the Paso Robles AVA.

History
The vineyard was started in 1986 when Bob and Janalyn Simpson purchased 128 acres from the King Vidor Estate. The Simpsons planted 10.6 acres in Cabernet grapes. The name of the vineyard derives from the large calcareous rocks laden with whalebones and other marine mammal fossils in the soil, remnants of the Miocene geological epoch some six million years ago. Notable adjacent properties include Tablas Creek Vineyard, owned by the Perrin Brothers of Château de Beaucastel and Robert Hass, and Adelaida Cellars,

Wines
Whalebone Vineyard bottles annual vintages of Cabernet Sauvignon, Zinfandel, Rhône wine blends, and a Marsanne-based white blend.

References

External links
 Whalebone Vineyard official website
 Whalebone Vineyard blog

Wineries in San Luis Obispo County
Companies based in San Luis Obispo County, California
Buildings and structures in Paso Robles, California
Paso Robles, California
Santa Lucia Range
1986 establishments in California